Dr. Murari Mohan Jha is an Indian politician (MLA) from Darbhanga, Bihar. He is a member of the present Bihar Legislative Assembly. Jha  contested the 2020 Bihar Legislative Assembly election on a BJP ticket and defeated his closest rival, Abdul Bari Siddiqui, a veteran leader of the Rashtiya Janta Dal.

References

Living people
Bihar MLAs 2020–2025
Bharatiya Janata Party politicians from Bihar
1957 births